Robert Baran (born 3 July 1992, in Jarocin) is a Polish freestyle wrestler. He competed in the men's freestyle 125 kg event at the 2016 Summer Olympics, in which he was eliminated in the quarterfinals by Tervel Dlagnev.

In 2020, he won the silver medal in the men's 125 kg event at the 2020 Individual Wrestling World Cup held in Belgrade, Serbia. In March 2021, he competed at the European Qualification Tournament in Budapest, Hungary hoping to qualify for the 2020 Summer Olympics in Tokyo, Japan.

In 2022, he won one of the bronze medals in the 125 kg event at the European Wrestling Championships held in Budapest, Hungary. A few months later, he won the silver medal in his event at the Matteo Pellicone Ranking Series 2022 held in Rome, Italy. He competed in the 125kg event at the 2022 World Wrestling Championships held in Belgrade, Serbia.

His brother Radosław is also a freestyle wrestler.

References

External links
 

1992 births
Living people
Polish male sport wrestlers
Olympic wrestlers of Poland
Wrestlers at the 2016 Summer Olympics
People from Jarocin
Sportspeople from Greater Poland Voivodeship
Wrestlers at the 2015 European Games
Wrestlers at the 2019 European Games
European Games competitors for Poland
European Wrestling Championships medalists
21st-century Polish people